Mistan is a village and municipality in the Lerik Rayon of Azerbaijan.  It has a population of 430.  The municipality consists of the villages of Mistan, Digov, Digovdərə, Qələbın, Pirəsora, and Xəlfəlikənd.

References 

Populated places in Lerik District